The Orthodox cathedral of the Ascension of Christ (Вознесенский собор) is a Russian Orthodox church in Zheleznodorozhny City District of Novosibirsk, Russia.

History
In 1913, the wooden church was built.

References

Churches in Siberia
Russian Orthodox cathedrals in Russia
Churches in Novosibirsk
Churches completed in 1913
Zheleznodorozhny City District, Novosibirsk